Yelland Dry Lake, also known as Dry Lakes is a playa and flat in Spring Valley in White Pine County, Nevada.

References

Landforms of White Pine County, Nevada